The 1999 Atlanta Braves season marked the franchise's 34th season in Atlanta and 129th overall. The Braves won their eighth consecutive division title with a 103-59 record and 6 game lead over the New York Mets. The Braves appeared in the World Series for the fifth time during the 1990s. The Braves lost all four games of the 1999 World Series to the New York Yankees, resulting in a sweep. The Braves played their 2nd World Series against the Yankees in 4 years, with the first being in 1996, which they lost in six games. Until 2021, this represented the Braves last National League pennant they have won. They would not return to the World Series until 22 years later.

Two key players on the 1999 Braves were Chipper Jones and John Rocker.  Jones won the National League's Most Valuable Player award with a .310 average, 45 HRs, 110 RBIs, and sealed the award with his September heroics against the New York Mets. Rocker recorded 38 saves as Atlanta's closer, but later created controversy due to his racist and homophobic comments in a December 27, 1999, Sports Illustrated article.

Offseason
November 10, 1998: Bret Boone was traded by the Cincinnati Reds with Mike Remlinger to the Atlanta Braves for Rob Bell, Denny Neagle, and Michael Tucker.
December 1, 1998: Otis Nixon was signed as a free agent with the Atlanta Braves.
December 1, 1998: Curtis Pride was released by the Atlanta Braves.

Regular season

Opening Day starters
 Otis Nixon – LF
 Bret Boone – 2B	
 Chipper Jones – 3B	
 Brian Jordan – RF
 Javy López – C	
 Ryan Klesko – 1B
 Andruw Jones – CF	
 Walt Weiss – SS
 Tom Glavine – P

Season standings

Record vs. opponents

Transactions
July 3, 1999: Pete Orr was signed by the Atlanta Braves as an amateur free agent.

Roster

Player stats

Batting

Starters by position
Note: Pos = Position; G = Games played; AB = At bats; H = Hits; Avg. = Batting average; HR = Home runs; RBI = Runs batted in

Other batters
Note: G = Games played; AB = At bats; H = Hits; Avg. = Batting average; HR = Home runs; RBI = Runs batted in

Pitching

Starting pitchers
Note: G = Games pitched; IP = Innings pitched; W = Wins; L = Losses; ERA = Earned run average; SO = Strikeouts

Other pitchers
Note: G = Games pitched; IP = Innings pitched; W = Wins; L = Losses; ERA = Earned run average; SO = Strikeouts

Relief pitchers
Note: G = Games pitched; W = Wins; L = Losses; SV = Saves; ERA = Earned run average; SO = Strikeouts

National League Division Series

Atlanta Braves vs. Houston Astros
Atlanta wins series, 3-1

National League Championship Series

Game 1

October 12: Turner Field, Atlanta

The Braves began their eighth consecutive NLCS with a 4-2 victory over the Mets, defeating a team they left for dead two weeks earlier. Greg Maddux tossed seven solid innings,  and future NLCS MVP Eddie Pérez who came up big for the absence of Javy López, homered. Light-hitting shortstop Walt Weiss went 3-for-4 with a run scored and RBI for the Braves.

John Rocker recorded the final four outs for the save, his second of the postseason, to seal Atlanta's fourth straight win.

Game 2

October 13: Turner Field, Atlanta

Game 3

October 15: Shea Stadium, Flushing, New York

Game 4

October 16: Shea Stadium, Flushing, New York

Game 5

October 17: Shea Stadium, Flushing, New York

Game 6

October 19: Turner Field, Atlanta

World Series

Game 1
October 23, 1999, at Turner Field in Atlanta.

Game 2
October 24, 1999, at Turner Field in Atlanta

Game 3
October 26, 1999, at Yankee Stadium in New York

Game 4 
October 27, 1999, at Yankee Stadium in New York

Award winners
 Andruw Jones, OF, Gold Glove for center field
 Chipper Jones, National League Most Valuable Player Award
 Chipper Jones, 3B, Silver Slugger Award
 Greg Maddux, P, Gold Glove Award
 John Smoltz, Pitcher of the Month Award, April

1999 Major League Baseball All-Star Game
 Brian Jordan, OF, reserve
 Kevin Millwood, P, reserve

Farm system

References

 1999 Atlanta Braves at Baseball Reference
 Atlanta Braves on Baseball Almanac

Atlanta Braves seasons
Atlanta Braves Season, 1999
National League East champion seasons
National League champion seasons
Atlanta